Philemon Wright High School is an anglophone high school located in the Hull sector of Gatineau, Quebec, Canada. It is administered by the Western Quebec School Board and named after Philemon Wright, founder of Hull. Philemon Wright High school also offers an Enriched French program course to students. 

The school was constructed in 1968. Its first principal was Clyde MacTavish, who remained in his position until 1976. Students who enrolled in Philemon Wright High School during its first year only had access to the second floor of one block in the building, resulting in over sixty students per classroom until Christmas, when the first-floor classrooms were ready for use. 

The building that houses the school is shared with Hadley Junior High School, which contains students from grades 7–8. The two schools are associated with each other within the Western Quebec School Board and share a website.

References

External links
Philemon Wright High School website
Philemon Wright High School - 50th Reunion - 2018 website

High schools in Gatineau
English-language schools in Quebec
Educational institutions established in 1968
1968 establishments in Quebec